Lili Pauline Reinhart (born September 13, 1996) is an American actress. She is known for portraying Betty Cooper on The CW teen drama series Riverdale (2017–present) and Annabelle in Lorene Scafaria's black comedy crime drama film Hustlers (2019). In 2020, she portrayed Grace Town in Chemical Hearts, a film adaptation of the novel Our Chemical Hearts by Krystal Sutherland.

Early life
Reinhart was born in Cleveland, Ohio, and raised in the nearby town of Bay Village. She is of German and French descent and has stated her surname is of German origin. She developed a love for singing, acting, and dancing at the age of 10, and asked her mom to drive her to New York City for auditions. Reinhart moved to Los Angeles when she was 18 years old to pursue acting and almost gave up after five months.

Career
Reinhart starred in the television pilot for Scientastic! (2010) and guest starred on the television series Law & Order: Special Victims Unit (2011). She also starred in the films Lilith (2011), Not Waving But Drowning (2012), The Kings of Summer (2013), Gibsonburg (2013), Forever's End (2013), Miss Stevens (2016), and The Good Neighbor (2016).

On February 9, 2016, Reinhart was cast as Betty Cooper in The CW's teen drama television series Riverdale, based on the characters of Archie Comics. Series creator Roberto Aguirre-Sacasa originally sought out Kiernan Shipka for the role after seeing her work in Mad Men. Reinhart auditioned twice for the role, first sending in an audition tape from her North Carolina home before appearing in person a month later.  The series premiered on January 26, 2017, and in February 2021, it was renewed for a sixth season. Previously, Reinhart worked on the Fox sitcom Surviving Jack.

In 2017, Reinhart was cast in Galveston, based on Nic Pizzolatto's 2010 novel of the same name. In the film, directed by Mélanie Laurent, Reinhart plays Tiffany, who was placed for adoption as a child. The film premiered at South by Southwest on March 10, 2018, and received a limited theatrical release through RLJE Films on October 19, 2018. Galveston received mixed critical reviews and grossed only $190,320 at the box office.

Reinhart joined the cast of Lorene Scafaria's Hustlers in March 2019. Reinhart played Annabelle, "the baby of the group," a former stripper who joins Ramona and her crew in drugging and robbing their Wall Street clientele. Reinhart described her character's aesthetic as "slutty Hannah Montana." A running gag shows Annabelle vomiting in times of stress, and the fake vomit was made of animal crackers and Sprite. Hustlers premiered at the Toronto International Film Festival on September 7, 2019, and was theatrically released in the United States the next week. The film received positive critical reviews and grossed $157.6 million worldwide. The same year, Reinhart made a cameo appearance during the mid-credits scene of Elizabeth Banks' Charlie's Angels (2019).

In June 2019, it was announced that Reinhart would star as the female lead of Amazon Studios' romantic drama film Chemical Hearts, written and directed by Richard Tanne and based on the 2016 Krystal Sutherland novel Our Chemical Hearts. Reinhart played Grace Town, a physically disabled high school senior who falls in love with school newspaper writer Henry Page. In addition to starring, Chemical Hearts was Reinhart's first executive producer credit. The film was released on August 21, 2020, on Amazon Prime Video and received mixed reviews.

In May 2020, Reinhart voiced Bella-Ella, "a ... snooty rich [girl]" in the Simpsons episode "The Hateful Eight-Year-Olds".

In March 2021, it was announced that Reinhart would star in Wanuri Kahiu's Look Both Ways. Reinhart will play Natalie, a college student whose life diverges into two parallel realities on the eve of her college graduation. In one reality, she becomes pregnant and must navigate motherhood as a young adult; in the other, she moves to LA to pursue her career. In addition to starring in the film, Look Both Ways will be Reinhart's second executive producer credit.

In June 2021, Reinhart's production company, Small Victory Productions, signed a deal with Amazon Studios. Small Victory Productions will develop original and adapted content for film and television with a focus on modern, young adult content that celebrates diversity and inclusivity, as well as supporting new voices.

Other ventures
In October 2019, Reinhart was announced as an ambassador for American Express for the relaunch of its AmexGreen Card. That same month, Reinhart became a spokesperson and ambassador for CoverGirl.

In September 2020, Reinhart released a book of poetry titled Swimming Lessons: Poems. The book explores themes such as "young love, anxiety, depression, fame, and heartbreak". For the week of October 18, 2020, Swimming Lessons: Poems debuted at No. 2 on The New York Times Best Seller list for paperback trade fiction.

Personal life
Reinhart is a Christian. She practices meditation and is training to be a reiki healer. Reinhart was diagnosed with depression at age 14. She also experiences anxiety and body dysmorphia. 

She came out as bisexual in June 2020.

Filmography

Film

Television

Podcast

Discography

Awards and nominations

Publications
Swimming Lessons: Poems (September 29, 2020)
September Love (November 3, 2020) (co-written with Lang Leav)

References

External links

 

1996 births
Living people
21st-century American actresses
American Christians
Actresses from Cleveland
American child actresses
American film actresses
American television actresses
Bisexual actresses
LGBT people from Ohio
American bisexual actors
LGBT Christians